Étobon is a commune in the Haute-Saône department in the region of Bourgogne-Franche-Comté in eastern France.

History

Crash of 1933

On this last day of October, the pilot Gaston Lafannechère was assisted by the mechanic Bloquet and the radio operator Camille Suply. The plane of the Air France company, which had hardly more than 1,500 flight hours, was, it seems, heavily loaded on departure from Basel. While it only carried two passengers in the comfortable cabin with eight adjustable back seats, heavy packages had been loaded, apparently not very securely stowed. According to Henri Colin, whose father was a P.T.T. In Lure at the time, L'Etoile d'Argent also carried mail bags that his father urgently took by taxi after the accident, for delivery by the normal route. Finally, the plane was still carrying five boxes containing 239 kg of gold (i.e. 4,302,000 francs at the time) and four chamois that the Basel Zoological Garden sent to London (one injured was completed on site, the others fled).
 
Regarding the general meteorological situation that reigned that day, it seems that the Paris region was well cleared which made the end of the trip safe. On the other hand, the east of France had to be covered, as often happens at this time of the year, with a thick layer of fog. Finally, let's not forget the altitude of Etobon Hill which is 575 meters.
Knowing all these data, one can imagine the large three-engined aircraft rising with difficulty in the freezing fog, not managing to get out of the opaque layer, its ascending capacities gradually disappearing, and worse, the propellers probably transformed into "sleeves of pickaxe "as the experienced pilots say, getting carried away without dragging the plane which finally collapses into the trees ...
In the accident of October 31, 1933, two occupants of the cabin were killed: the radio Camille Suply and a passenger, Dr. Werner Spoeri (pharmacist in Einsideln in Switzerland writes Michel Bregnard).

Second World War
On 27 September 1944, 39 men from Étobon were shot by German troops against the Protestant temple of Chenebier, village near Etobon, and 27 others taken as prisoners in retaliation for the death of a German general killed on 9 September by the French resistance in the nearby forest between Belverne and Lyoffans. The town received the Croix de Guerre 1939-1945 after the Second World War and the Legion of Honour in 1949.

See also
Communes of the Haute-Saône department

References

Communes of Haute-Saône